The 2016–17 Estonian Cup was the 27th season of the Estonian main domestic football knockout tournament. FCI Tallinn won their first title after defeating Tammeka 2–0 in the final.

The winner of the Cup were to qualify for the 2017–18 UEFA Europa League, but as FCI Tallinn were already qualified for the Champions League as 2016 Meistriliiga champions the spot passed to Flora.

First round
The draw was made by Estonian Football Association on 21 May 2016, on the half-time of the 2015–16 final of the same competition.
League level of the club in the brackets.
Rahvaliiga RL (people's league) is a league organized by Estonian Football Association, but not part of the main league system.

Notes
Note 1: Tallinna JK Ararat TTÜ withdrew from the competition.
Note 2: SK Roosu withdrew from the competition.
Note 3: JK Pedajamäe withdrew from the competition.
Note 4:  JK Kaitseliit Kalev dissolved before the competition.
Note 5: JK Väätsa Vald withdrew from the competition.

Byes
These teams were not drawn and secured a place in the second round without playing:
 Meistriliiga (Level 1): Tallinna FC Infonet, JK Narva Trans, Paide Linnameeskond, Tallinna FC Levadia, 
 Esiliiga (2): FC Flora U21
 Esiliiga B (3): Raasiku FC Joker, Viimsi JK 
 II Liiga (4): Jõgeva SK Noorus-96, Saue JK Laagri, Jõhvi FC Lokomotiv, Türi Ganvix JK, FC Kose, Viimsi JK II, Kiviõli FC Irbis, Tõrva JK, Tallinna JK Legion,  
 III Liiga (5): EMÜ SK, Tartu Ülikool Fauna, FC Tartu, SK Imavere Forss, Maardu United, JK Loo, Läänemaa JK Haapsalu, Nõmme Kalju FC III
 IV Liiga (6): Tallinna JK Jalgpallihaigla, Tallinna Jalgpalliselts, Rumori Calcio Tallinn

Second round 
The draw for the second round was made on 16 June 2016. 

Notes
Note 6: EMÜ SK were awarded a win as Castovanni Eagles fielded an unregistered player. The original score was 9–1.
Note 7: Molycorp Silmet were awarded a win as SK Imavere Forss fielded an unregistered player. The original score was 2–3.

Third round 
The draw for the third round was made on 11 August 2016.

Fourth round
The draw for the fourth round was made on 21 September 2016.

Quarter-finals
The draw was made on 28 February 2017.

Semi-finals
The draw was held on 13 April 2017.

Final

See also
 2016 Meistriliiga
 2016 Esiliiga
 2016 Esiliiga B

References

External links
 Official website 

Estonian Cup seasons
Cup
Cup
Estonian